Zaqy bin Mohamad (Jawi: زاقي محمد; born 1974) is a Singaporean politician who has been serving as Deputy Leader of the House, Senior Minister of State for Manpower and Senior Minister of State for Defence concurrently since 2020. A member of the governing People's Action Party (PAP), he has been the Member of Parliament (MP) representing the Marsiling division of Marsiling–Yew Tee GRC since 2020.

Prior to entering politics, Zaqy had worked at Arthur Andersen, IBM Business Consulting Services, Avanade, Dimension Data and Ernst & Young.

He made his political debut in the 2006 general election as part of a five-member PAP team contesting in Hong Kah GRC and won by an uncontested walkover. He contested in Chua Chu Kang GRC in the 2011 and 2015 general elections and retained his parliamentary seat in both elections. During the 2020 general election, he contested in Marsiling–Yew Tee GRC and won.

He had served as Minister of State for National Development and Minister of State for Manpower concurrently between 2018 and 2020.

Education
Zaqy was educated at St. Michael's School, Raffles Institution and Raffles Junior College before graduating from the Nanyang Technological University with a Bachelor of Engineering degree in electrical and electronic engineering. He was President of NTU Students' Union and he championed student welfare and financial assistance programmes for needy students during his tenure.

He subsequently went on to complete a Master of Science degree in financial engineering at the Nanyang Technological University.

Career 
Zaqy was a senior consultant at Arthur Andersen from 1999 to 2002 before he became a business consultant at IBM Business Consulting Services from 2002 to 2005. He then became the Solutions Director at Avanade in 2005 before becoming Sales Head at Dimension Data in 2008. In 2014, he joined Ernst & Young as a partner with the ASEAN Business Development unit.

Political career 
Zaqy entered politics in the 2006 general election as part of a five-member People's Action Party (PAP) team contesting in Hong Kah GRC. After the PAP team won by an uncontested walkover, Zaqy became a Member of Parliament representing the Keat Hong ward of Hong Kah GRC. During the 2011 general election, Hong Kah GRC was reconstituted as Chua Chu Kang GRC so Zaqy contested in this new GRC as part of a five-member PAP team. They won with 61.2% of the vote against the National Solidarity Party and Zaqy continued serving as the Member of Parliament representing the Keat Hong ward of Chua Chu Kang GRC.

During the 2015 general election, Zaqy joined the four-member PAP team contesting in Chua Chu Kang GRC and they won with 76.89% of the vote against the People's Power Party. Zaqy was co-opted into the PAP's Central Executive Committee on 5 January 2015, but had to leave due to regulatory compliance reasons as he was also working at Ernst & Young, which was the auditor for the PAP.

On 8 August 2017, after Halimah Yacob resigned from her position as a Member of Parliament representing the Marsiling ward in Marsiling–Yew Tee GRC to participate in the 2017 presidential election, Zaqy was appointed as a grassroots adviser, under the government-linked People's Association, for the Marsiling ward.

On 1 May 2018, Zaqy was appointed Minister of State at the Ministry of National Development and Ministry of Manpower. He also served as Deputy Government Whip from 6 June 2019 to 18 August 2020.

In the 2020 general election, Zaqy joined the four-member PAP team contesting in Marsiling–Yew Tee GRC and they won with 63.18% of the vote against the Singapore Democratic Party, after which Zaqy became the Member of Parliament representing the Marsiling ward. On 27 July 2020, Zaqy was promoted to Senior Minister of State at the Ministry of Manpower and Ministry of Defence. He also became Deputy Leader of the House in Parliament on 20 August 2020.

Personal life 
Zaqy is married to Haryane Mustajab, the Chief Operating Officer and Head of Finance at law firm Bird & Bird ATMD.

See also
 List of Singapore MPs
 List of current Singapore MPs

References

People's Action Party politicians
Members of the Parliament of Singapore
1974 births
Living people
Singaporean people of Malay descent
Singaporean Muslims
Raffles Junior College alumni